The following is a list of county routes in Essex County in the U.S. state of New Jersey.  For more information on the county route system in New Jersey as a whole, including its history, see County routes in New Jersey.

500-series county routes
In addition to those listed below, the following 500-series county routes serve Essex County:
CR 506, CR 506 Spur, CR 508, CR 508 Spur, CR 509, CR 510, CR 527, CR 577

Other county routes

See also

References

 
Essex